Leporinus multimaculatus is a species of anostomid fish. It is endemic to Brazil and found in small tributaries of the Rio Araguaia, the Rio Tocantins and the Rio Xingu basins. It is also found in the Rio Jari basin and coastal drainages of Amapá state. This species can reach a length of  SL.

References

Anostomidae
Freshwater fish of Brazil
Endemic fauna of Brazil
Taxa named by José Luis Olivan Birindelli
Taxa named by Túlio Franco Teixeira
Taxa named by Heraldo Antonio Britski
Fish described in 2016